David Gasman  is an American television, film and voice actor. He has appeared in many cartoons and video games, such as Rayman, Code Lyoko, and Dragon Ball films. In his acting career, he acted in Jefferson in Paris, The Bourne Identity, Arthur and the Revenge of Maltazard, Babylon A.D., Largo Winch and many theatrical productions, including several musicals. He had a recurring role in Kaboul Kitchen, a French TV series.

He appeared in all of the Quantic Dream games: The Nomad Soul, Fahrenheit, Heavy Rain, Beyond: Two Souls and Detroit: Become Human.

Biography and career
Gasman was born in Seattle, Washington and graduated from the professional acting conservatory at Cornish College of the Arts. While pursuing an interest in poetry and Shakespeare, he became an English-speaking actor and voice actor living in Paris, France. Gasman also dubbed various characters, mainly Goku and Oolong, in the Dragon Ball and Dragon Ball Z films. He has acted in small roles in live-action films such as Largo Winch, From Paris With Love and The Bourne Identity.

Filmography

Live-action credits

Television

Film

Voice acting credits

Film

Television

Video games

References

External links

Living people
American casting directors
American expatriates in France
American expatriate male actors in France
France
American male film actors
American male television actors
American male video game actors
American male voice actors
American translators
Cornish College of the Arts alumni
Male actors from Seattle
American voice directors
Year of birth missing (living people)
20th-century American male actors
21st-century American male actors